This is the list of Dreamcast online games that can be played on SegaNet

Games

See also 

 List of Dreamcast games

References

Dreamcast games